The Regina Public Library is the citywide public library system of Regina, Saskatchewan, Canada.

Services

Information and reference services
Access to full text databases
Community information

Internet access
Reader's advisory services
Programs for children, youth and adults

 Delivery to homebound individuals
 Interlibrary loan
 Free downloadable audiobooks

The Regina Public Library is established under the provisions of The Public Libraries Act, 1996. The general management, regulation, and control of the Library is vested in the Regina Public Library Board.  The Board consists of the Mayor of Regina and eight members of the public appointed by the City Council for two-year terms.

Locations
Regina Public Library has nine locations and provides service  in the form of resources, programs, and client and staff interactions.

Film Theatre
The RPL Film Theatre, which is located at the Central Library, screens world cinema - up to fifteen films a month. The Film Theatre provides a wide range of films to accommodate a range of tastes and is the only cinema in the city to present contemporary and alternative cinema: Canadian, foreign and independent films and documentaries.

Dunlop Art Gallery
The Dunlop Art Gallery, located at Central Library and Sherwood Village Library, is dedicated to presenting, researching, and engaging a diverse range of visual arts and culture.

Prairie History Room
The Prairie History Room  is a specialized collection of research and genealogical materials focusing on the history and development of the Prairies from pre-settlement times to present day. The room is located on the main floor of Central Library.

Special literacy services
The library also offers special literacy services and programs for all ages. The unit is located on the second floor of Central Library.

Branches

Regina Public Library has nine branches.

Central Library
Central Library is located in downtown Regina, on 12th Avenue between Lorne and Smith Street, across Lorne Street from Victoria Park and on the site of the second Carnegie Library. "On December 5, [1962,] the...[current] Central Library was officially opened." In Canada as in the UK, Ireland and the USA, public libraries were amply endowed by the Carnegie foundation and burgesses soon took for granted and the public quickly demanded that such services continue to be funded and provided. In other jurisdictions — Australia is a notably deficient one — where Carnegie did not offer such endowment, the concept of public libraries is largely alien. Sydney, a city of some 2 million, for example, has a public library substantially smaller than that of Regina, a city of some 200 thousand. Its precedent was built after the Regina Cyclone destroyed the original, on the same and today's site (see Regina's historic buildings and precincts).

"It is the largest of the nine libraries in the system, and it is a social and informational hub in the heart of downtown Regina. Central maintains an extensive calendar of programs, training opportunities and art exhibits in the Dunlop Art Gallery, along with film screenings in the Library's own repertory film theatre. Its story room has been a favoured recital hall since its opening. The system's Children's Library is located in the Central Branch's lower-level."

"The original Carnegie building was demolished in June 1961, and the work on the new library began immediately by the contractor Smith Brothers & Wilson. The architects for the new Central Library were Izumi, Arnott & Sugiyama." Assorted detritus and rubble from the previous library building is featured decoratively in the library forecourt. "The stonework bearing the sign "Regina Public Library" was saved from the old building and placed in the entrance way of the new building. A circular medallion bearing the library crest - torch and open book inscribed 'Qui Legit Regit' -- He who reads, rules—is still displayed today. But one of the founders of the Library, the artist Regine Witt, announced that they are going to change it to 'Qui Legit Pingit' -- He who reads, paints.

Albert Library
Albert Library is located in North Central Regina on Robinson Street, just north of Dewdney Avenue.  It is an inner-city branch that serves the North Central area of Regina. The building was designed by the architect Joseph Warburton and opened in 1927. A significant segment of the population in this area is of aboriginal ancestry; the library offers an extensive collection of adult and juvenile items that focus on aboriginal peoples. The library also offers programming that develops knowledge and understanding of the diverse cultural groups in Regina, while highlighting the aboriginal community.

Connaught Library
Connaught Library is located on the corner of Elphinstone and 13th Avenue in the leafy West End (latterly deemed the "Cathedral Area") of Regina, across Elphinstone Street from Connaught Public School, opened in 1913 after a visit to Regina by the vastly popular Prince Arthur, Duke of Connaught, the then-Governor General, his wife and even more popular daughter, Princess Patricia of Connaught.

It is one of Regina Public Library's inner-city branches and it offers visitors a variety of services and diverse collections. This branch was designed by the architect Joseph Warburton and first opened to the public in 1930, and continues to play a pivotal role in the community, co-sponsoring programs with the Cathedral Area Community Association and the Community Schools in the neighbourhood.  This Library offers after-school programming for children, as well as a selection of programming for teens and adults that reflects the diversified interest of this area of Regina.

George Bothwell Library
George Bothwell Library is located in the south area of Southland Mall on Gordon Road.  This Library first opened its doors to the public in 1995, and operates as a full-service branch within the Regina Public Library system.  This branch has a seating area with comfortable chairs, natural light, and lush plants. Renovations completed on the library in 2016 include direct mall access, increased seating area, and collaborative spaces.

Glen Elm Library
Glen Elm Library is located on Dewdney Avenue between Oxford and Cavendish Streets next to the Glencairn Shopping Centre.  It is a full-service branch that offers a variety of programs, services, and collections suitable for all ages.

Prince of Wales Library 
Prince of Wales Library is located just east of downtown Regina, near Elliott St. and 14th Avenue.  It is a cozy inner-city branch of Regina Public Library that offers visitors a variety of services and resources. Open since 1913, the Prince of Wales Library is of the oldest branches in the system, and was located in one of the oldest buildings in the city of Regina until its move in 2011 to a newly built location attached to the Core-Ritchie Neighbourhood Centre. The Prince of Wales branch has popular and up-to-date reading and listening materials. There is a collection of fiction and non-fiction paperbacks; there are also popular items for children, such as board books, picture books, and comics. Visitors to this branch can also find music CDs, a DVD collection, and more than 100 popular magazines and newspapers.

Regent Place Library 
Regent Place Library is currently located in the northern area of Regina at 331 Albert Street in the Market Mall.  In 1966, Regina Public Library opened its first shopping mall location in what was then known as Regent Park Branch. Nearly thirty years later, Regent Place Library moved to a different location at Albert St. and 5th Street.  
In August 2012, Regent Place Library moved two blocks south to its current location.  The Library is a full-service branch, which offers free public programs for all ages, access to computer workstations, and a variety of collections.

Sherwood Village Library 
Sherwood Village Library is located in the northwest area of Regina, near the Rochdale Crossing on Rochdale Blvd.  This is a full-service Library that offers free public programs for all ages and houses a wide variety of collections.

Sunrise Library 
Sunrise Library shares its facilities with the Sandra Schmirler Leisure Centre, located in southeast Regina.  Sunrise Library first opened its doors to the public in 1990 and since then has operated a small branch with a wide variety of programs, services, and collections.

See also
List of Carnegie libraries in Canada

References 

Public libraries in Saskatchewan
Culture of Regina, Saskatchewan
Tourist attractions in Regina, Saskatchewan
Organizations based in Regina, Saskatchewan